Chullumpina (chullumpi local name for the white-tufted grebe, -na a Quechua suffix,  "the place of the white-tufted grebe") is a mountain in the Vilcanota mountain range in the Andes of Peru, about  high. It is situated in the Cusco Region, Canchis Province, Pitumarca District. Chullumpina lies west of the large lake named Sibinacocha.

References

Mountains of Peru
Mountains of Cusco Region
Lakes of Peru
Lakes of Cusco Region